Mule train may refer to:

 Mule train (transport), a connected or unconnected line of mules, pulling or carrying cargo or riders
 Mule Train, 1949 popular song written by Johnny Lange, Hy Heath, Doc Tommy Scott and Fred Glickman
 Mule Train, a 1950 Western film starring Gene Autry and Sheila Ryan
 Project Mule Train, which used C-123 aircraft, provided tactical airlift support for ground troops in South Vietnam, from December 11, 1961 to December 8, 1962
 The Mule Train, a protest caravan as part of Martin Luther King and Ralph Abernathy's Poor People's Campaign, where protestors rode in covered wagons pulled by mules leaving Marks, Mississippi on 13 May 1968 to converge on Washington, D.C.